Goodenia virgata is a species of flowering plant in the family Goodeniaceae and is endemic to the Tanami Desert in central Australia. It is an erect to ascending herb with more or less thick, linear to lance-shaped leaves with the narrower end towards the base, and racemes of yellow flowers.

Description
Leaves on the stems are smaller. Flowering occurs from May to November.

Taxonomy and naming
Goodenia virgata was first formally described in 1980 by Roger Charles Carolin in the journal Telopea from a specimen he collected near Yuendumu in 1970. The specific epithet (virgata) means "having long, slender twigs", referring to the appearance of the plant after the fruit has fallen.

Distribution
This goodenia grows in sandy soil in the southern Tanami Desert in Western Australia and the Northern Territory.

Conservation status
Goodenia virgata is classified as "not threatened" by the Government of Western Australia Department of Parks and Wildlife and as of "least concern" under the Northern Territory Government Territory Parks and Wildlife Conservation Act 1976.

References

virgata
Eudicots of Western Australia
Flora of the Northern Territory
Plants described in 1980
Taxa named by Roger Charles Carolin